George Davidge (17 April 1895 – 1978) was an English rugby union, and professional rugby league footballer who played in the 1920s.

Background
George Davidge was born in Taunton, Somerset, and his death aged 83 was registered in Blackpool & Fylde district, Lancashire, England.

Playing career

International honours
George Davidge won a cap for England (RL) while at Batley in 1924 against Other Nationalities.

Championship final appearances
George Davidge played right-, i.e. number 3, in Batley's 13-7 victory over Wigan in the 1923–24 Championship Final during the 1923–24 season, at The Cliff, Broughton, Salford on Saturday 3 May 1924, in front of a crowd of 13,729.

County Cup Final appearances
George Davidge played right-, i.e. number 3, in Batley's 8-9 defeat by Wakefield Trinity in the 1924–25 Yorkshire County Cup Final during the 1924–25 season at Headingley Rugby Stadium, Leeds on Saturday 22 November 1924, in front of a crowd of 25,546.

Club career
George Davidge left Plymouth Albion R.F.C. to sign for Huddersfield in October 1921, he was transferred from Huddersfield to Batley on 28 September 1923 for a transfer fee of £300 (based on increases in average earnings, this would be approximately £56,260 in 2016).

Genealogical information
George Davidge's marriage to Martha Ann (née Connor) (23 July 1901 – first ¼ 1978 (aged 76)) was registered during third ¼ 1929 in Dewsbury district.

References

External links

1895 births
1978 deaths
Batley Bulldogs players
England national rugby league team players
English rugby league players
English rugby union players
Huddersfield Giants players
Plymouth Albion R.F.C. players
Rugby league centres
Rugby league players from Somerset
Rugby union players from Taunton